The Chuitna Coal Project is a proposed coal strip mine that, if granted state and federal permits, would be built about  southwest of Anchorage, Alaska, in an area known as the Beluga Coal Fields near the Chuitna River and the small communities of Tyonek and Beluga in upper Cook Inlet.

Proposal
The Chuitna Coal Project is a proposal of PacRim LP, a Delaware-based corporation owned by the Texas-based energy company Petro-Hunt LLC. Proven reserves are reported to be 771 million tons. The company is in the advanced stages of state and federal mine-permitting processes. PacRim has surveyed three Logical Mining Units, or LMUs, within its lease. If permitted, the company has said it plans to extract up to 12 million metric tons of coal from the first of these units over a minimum period of 25 years. Other LMUs, could be developed in future years.

Ladd Landing is property owned by the Kenai Peninsula Borough and subject to a lease-option held by PacRim. A letter of intent to exercise the Ladd Landing option was filed by PacRim in March, 2009. For more, see Lease-Option History section below.

Only about 10 percent of Alaska's electricity is generated by coal, all of which is produced by the Usibelli Coal Mine, near Healy, Alaska. That operation supplies six Interior Alaska power plants and ships its surplus overseas. Currently, Alaska's coal-fired generating capacity has no need for the coal that would be produced at Chuitna. Thus, coal extracted from the Chuitna project would most likely be shipped to Asian markets, including South Korea, Japan and Mainland China, with other possible markets being Mexico and Chile.

Interest in exploiting the resources in the Beluga Coal Fields has waxed and waned over the decades since the late 1960s, with the lease passing through a succession of corporate hands. The proposed Chuitna Coal Project has both proponents and opponents and is becoming increasingly controversial in the Cook Inlet region.

Geography
The proposed Chuitna Coal Project mine site is located within PacRim's lease area designated as follows: Sec 14, 15, 21-28 and 33-36, T13N, R12W, Seward Meridian.

Land ownership
Land within and around PacRim's lease area is owned by a variety of entities, including the State of Alaska, the Alaska Mental Health Trust Authority, the Kenai Peninsula Borough, the Tyonek Native Corp., Cook Inlet Region, Inc. (CIRI), and private owners. Two state wildlife refuges are near the project zone. They are the Susitna Flats Wildlife Refuge to the northeast, and the Trading Bay Wildlife Refuge to the southwest. According to the state, neither would be affected by the mining project. CIRI owns a scattering of properties around the mine site. Private land is mostly along the Cook Inlet coastline in Beluga, Tyonek, as well as at North Forelands and south of Granite Point, which are coastal locations south of Tyonek.

Lease-option history
The Kenai Peninsula Borough-PacRim Ladd Landing lease-option document shows that in 1987, the borough entered a lease-option agreement with Tidewater Services Corp, which merged with Midgard Energy Co., in 1994. That year, Midgard assigned its option to Richard Bass, William Herbert Hunt, and William Herbert Hunt Trust Estate. The option was extended multiple times through years while coal mining in the state lease area remained financially impractical. Early in 2008, Bass, Hunt and the Hunt Trust Estate assigned the Ladd Landing option to PacRim Coal LP. In March 2009, PacRim signed a letter of intent to exercise its Ladd Landing option. As of April 2009, the Kenai Peninsula Borough's Land Management Office had begun the process of bringing that lease to closing under the existing 1987 terms, a process that had to be completed within 180 days. According to borough officials, the two sides will renegotiate terms they have mutually agreed are outdated and in need of revision.

Access
No roads connect the project area to Alaska's highway system. The areas is accessible only by sea and air. Airstrips exist at Beluga and Tyonek. PacRim proposes to build a third airstrip in the project area. ConocoPhillips has a private strip south of the Beluga Power Plant. Gravel roads connect Tyonek and Beluga, and there are remnants of old roads used for logging, oil, gas and coal exploration efforts. Barge landing areas exist at Ladd Landing, Tyonek and Granite Point, and are used to supply local residents.

Risks and rewards of development
Risks
Extracting coal from the Beluga Coal Fields is an idea decades old, but several factors have so far discouraged construction, including the costs associated with developing a mine, the market price of coal, the lack of demand for coal in Alaska, among others. In recent years, opposition to mining the fields has grown, specifically with respect to PacRim's Chuitna Coal Project, the project most advanced in state and federal permitting processes. Many Alaskans, including fisheries biologists, are voicing opposition because of the mine's proposed location amid environmentally important wetlands and because of the nature of coal itself. There is no precedent in Alaska for permitting mining in active salmon streams, and no guarantee that post-mine mitigation would restore the ecosystems. Chuitna would be the first if permits were granted. Regarding coal itself, the U.S. has about a quarter of the world's reserves; it has been called the Saudi Arabia of coal. U.S. coal-fired power plants generate roughly half the nation's electricity, according to the United States Department of Energy. But coal is problematic. It is dirtiest of fossil fuels, and burning it produces a third of the nation's carbon dioxide (CO2), a greenhouse gas contributing to climate change.

Because of PacRim's proposal, the non-profit organization American Rivers named the Chuitna one of America's 10 "Most Endangered Rivers" in 2007 and again in 2015.
Rewards
Chuitna's developers predict mine construction and operation will produce between 300 and 350 good-paying jobs, and royalties to the state upwards of $350 million over the 25-year lifespan of the first Logical Mining Unit project. PacRim also expects numerous service contracts with the local business community. PacRim will develop Ladd Landing as a port (see above) for loading large vessels that would transport the coal to Asian markets. That port could be important for the future development of public and private property on the west side of Cook Inlet. The 300 million tons PacRim expects to excavate from its Chuitna mine is thought to equal two-thirds of the total recoverable coal in the Beluga Coal Fields. Some estimates put the total at around 500 million tons. If the transport infrastructure to Cook Inlet is built, it is likely that, over time, coal mining in the region would expand.

Environmental issues of the mining phase
That effluent would reach Cook Inlet. The NPDES documents demonstrate that PacRim anticipates a variety of discharge pollutants, including organic carbon, assorted suspended solids, ammonia, nitrates, oil and grease, and metals including aluminum, iron, and manganese. In addition, housing and other operational facilities would be expected to discharge small amounts of fecal coliform and residual chlorine. According to the NPDES filing, PacRim would build four sedimentation ponds to remove some suspended solids. Three ponds would receive runoff from areas affected by mining operations, the fourth would receive runoff from mine facilities. Four outfall locations would discharge effluent to the fresh water creeks, waterbodies that support all five species of Pacific salmon, as well as Dolly Varden and trout.

To date, no permit allowing mining operations to mine through and destroy a salmon stream has ever been issued by the Alaska Department of Natural Resources. Such a permit would be precedent-setting. Alaska has strict laws governing the protection of natural systems such as salmon streams. A clean, clear-water environment is crucial for successful natural salmon rearing. How those laws might be applied during the permitting process remains to be seen.

PacRim's planned port at Ladd Landing would affect existing shoreline salmon set net fishing sites and the coal-loading trestle necessary to reach deep water would affect fish migration zones and the habitat of an endangered species of beluga whale (Delphinapterus leucas also known as white whale) that is distinct to Cook Inlet. Under provisions of the 1973 Endangered Species Act, the National Marine Fisheries Service placed the Cook Inlet species on the nation's Endangered Species list. What effect that may have on permitting PacRim's port facilities has yet to be determined.

Post-mining environmental concerns
Repairing the damage surface strip mining leaves behind is costly and a considerable physical enterprise. A specific federal law governs such recovery phases, and would apply to a Chuitna Coal Project. It is called the Surface Mining Control and Reclamation Act of 1977. The act created the Office of Surface Mining within the U.S. Department of the Interior. State programs - in Alaska's case, the Alaska Division of Mining, Land & Water - generally regulate mines, but among the OSM's jobs is inspecting state programs to ensure they are meeting federal requirements.

See also
Coal mining in the United States

References

External links
 Chuinta Citizens Coalition - www.chuitna.org
 Ground Truth Trekking - Chuitna Coal Mine
 Chuitna Coal Project Supplemental Environmental Impact Statement Site
 Alaska Coal webpage
 Alaska Miners Association
 Trustees for Alaska
 Cook Inletkeeper
News
Alaska Journal of Commerce (story): Dec. 4, 2005( Asia targeted as a market for undeveloped Beluga coal fields"
Alaska Journal of Commerce (story): (Dec. 11, 2005) "Timing for developing Beluga coal may be right"
Peninsula Clarion (story):(Dec. 18, 2006) "Coal — energy of the future?"
Peninsula Clarion (story):(Dec. 19, 2006) "Coal mine worth the risks?"
Mining Top News (story): (Dec. 23, 2006) "Beluga coal deposits eyed as Southcentral gas wanes"
Peninsula Clarion (story):(April 26, 2007) "PacRim shares plans"
Anchorage Daily News (AP) (story):(March 18, 2008) "Citizens' group files suit over Chuitna coal plan"
Alaska Journal of Commerce (story): (Nov. 9, 2008) "Village of Tyonek seeks to build energy, industrial town"
Anchorage Daily News, Compass (op-ed): (May 18, 2009) "Easement will protect Chuitna River"
Peninsula Clarion (Letter to Editor)" (July 7, 2009) "Now is not the time to further endanger king returns"
Peninsula Clarion (op-ed): (Aug. 11, 2009) "Is the risk really worth it?: Scientists say Chuitna strip mine wrong project for Alaska"
Planet Save (Green Options Media) (story): (Aug. 17, 2009) "Coal Strip Mine Would Destroy Salmon Streams in Cook Inlet"
Anchorage Daily News (op-ed): Aug. 27, 2009) "Just say 'no' to this coal strip mine in Alaska salmon streams"

Coal mining in the United States
Buildings and structures in Kenai Peninsula Borough, Alaska
Mines in Alaska